Scott Floyd Lochmus is an American producer and director who has worked with artists such as Barbra Streisand, Celine Dion, Jim Gaffigan, Michael Shannon, Prince, and The Rolling Stones.

Early years
Lochmus was born in Miami, Florida, and adopted by a New York family in 1967.

Career
Lochmus has served as founder and owner of Jack My Dog production company since 1996 and as co-founder and partner of Storyland Pictures since 2009.

1990s
Lochmus started his career as an intern at Silvercup Studios In New York. Lochmus then served at Sony Music Studios as Senior Director of Production from 1993 to 1996 and as vice president from 1996 to 1997.

In 1995, Lochmus was a line director for the television special Swing into Christmas. In 1997, he directed a video short called Tell Him. The same year, he directed another video short for Celine Dion, The Reason.

In 1998, he worked with Celine Dion again on two projects, one was a music video for her song "Immortality" and the other was for a documentary, Let's Talk About Love.

2000s
In 2000, Lochmus was an executive producer on the film 101 Ways (The Things a Girl Will Do to Keep Her Volvo) and directed a short film called Being Scott Lochmus. In 2001, he directed a television movie 2001 Winter Special Olympics and a video documentary short about Britney Spears titled Britney: The Videos.

In 2003 Lochmus produced and directed the television movie Céline Dion: One Year, One Heart. In 2004, Lochmus directed a television movie called Hong Kong Rocks, along with a short film for Dion called Je lui dirai. 2005 and 2006 Lochmus produced the television movie documentary about Elvis Presley named Elvis by the Presleys and Korn: Live on the Other Side

Lochmus then directed two projects for Usher, Usher's Project Restart and the other featuring the band Korn called KoRn Presents: See You on the Other Side.

From 2007 to 2008, Lochmus directed and produced a television movie, Yo-Yo Ma & Friends: Songs of Joy & Peace, and a video documentary called Celine Dion Taking Chances: The Sessions. Lochmus then directed another project about Elvis Presley, Elvis: Viva Las Vegas. In 2009, Lochmus co-produced the film The Joneses and directed Academy Award-winning short film Man.Woman.Blackbird.

2010s
Lochmus co-produced Venus and Vegas and produced the television special 2010 FIFA World Cup Kick-off Celebration concert. In the same year, he produced and directed One Night Only: Barbra Streisand and Quartet at the Village Vanguard.

In 2011, he directed Buddy Holly's Buddy Holly: Listen to Me; The Ultimate Buddy Party. In 2013, Lochmus produced the drama Dark Around the Stars and directed the television movie Barbra Streisand: Back to Brooklyn.

In 2014, Lochmus directed his first television series Duck Quacks Don't Echo with 10 episodes and a television movie Kristin Chenoweth: Coming Home.

In 2015, Lochmus produced the drama thriller H8RZ and was the consulting producer on the television special The 30th Annual Imagen Awards. In the same year, Lochmus directed "Hymn" music video. From 2016 to 2017, Lochmus was the executive producer for the drama London Town and produced the comedy Pottersville. In 2018, Lochmus produced two thrillers: Boarding School and American Dreamer. He also produced a drama, To Dust. Lochmus also served as director for the inaugural concert event for launching Earth's Call Foundation.

Awards
Lochmus received the Soho House Script Award in 2018, the Tribeca Film Festival Audience Award in 2018, the Telly Award & the NY International Independent Film & Video Festival.

Personal
Lochmus lives in Los Angeles with his wife Michelle and their three children.

References

External links

Living people
American film producers
American film directors
Year of birth missing (living people)